La Llamada (The Sweet Sound of Death in English) is a 1965 Spanish film.

Reception
On reviewer said the film "is devoid of overt shocks, but is long on atmosphere and tension that slowly builds to a fittingly eerie climax."

References

External links
 

1965 films
1960s Spanish-language films
1960s ghost films
Romantic horror films
Films produced by Sidney W. Pink
Spanish ghost films
American ghost films
1960s English-language films
1960s American films
1960s Spanish films